William Baxter Godbey (June 3, 1833 - September 12, 1920) was a Wesleyan Methodist evangelist.

Biography
He was born June 3, 1833 in Pulaski County, Kentucky.  He converted Alma White in a Kentucky schoolhouse revival in 1878. She wrote that "some were so convicted that they left the room and threw up their suppers, and staggered back into the house as pale as death."

References

1833 births
1920 deaths
American Methodists
Arminian ministers
Arminian writers
History of Methodism
People from Pulaski County, Kentucky